= Combined word =

Combined word may refer to:

- Portmanteau word, a word which fuses two or more function words
- Compound (linguistics), a lexeme (less precisely, a word) that consists of more than one stem
